Kamar Siah (also Romanized as Kamar Sīāh and Kamar Seyāh; also known as Sīāh Kamareh-ye Soflá, Asadābād-e Kamar Sīāh, Kamareh Sīāh, and Kamar Sīāh-e Soflá) is a village in Honam Rural District, in the Central District of Selseleh County, Lorestan Province, Iran. At the 2006 census, its population was 152, in 30 families.

References 

Towns and villages in Selseleh County